La Prairie is an off-island suburb (south shore) of Montreal, in southwestern Quebec, Canada, at the confluence of the Saint-Jacques River and the Saint Lawrence River in the Regional County Municipality of Roussillon. The population as of the Canada 2011 Census was 23,357.

History 

French Jesuits were the first Europeans to occupy the area, which was named La Prairie de la Magdelaine but was also called François-Xavier-des-Prés. The land was given to the Jesuits by Jacques de La Ferté and the Company of One Hundred Associates in 1647.  It is in La Prairie that the story Kateri Tekakwitha took place.

In 1668, the site was named Kentaké, the Iroquois name for "at the prairie". In the beginning of modern Quebec history, the territory of La Prairie would be visited on numerous occasions by Iroquois and English settlers from New York, among others at the time of the Anglo-Iroquois expedition of Pieter Schuyler in 1691, who commanded two battles on August 11, 1691.

The close of the Seven Years' War led to the 1763 treaty ending the French and Indian War. New France, sparsely-populated by indigenous peoples and descendants of French colonists, was ceded by France and divided into British colonies. The territory of La Prairie became part of the Province of Quebec (1763–1791) within the British Empire.

In 1845, the village of La Prairie was established. One year later, La Prairie-de-la-Magdelaine was established. La Prairie was the seat of Laprairie County (1855-1980s), which included the parishes of La Prairie, Notre-Dame, Ste-Catherine, St-Constant, St-Isidore, St-Jacques-le-Mineur, St-Mathieu and St-Philippe. In 1909, La Prairie obtained official city status.

Historically, the city has been an important transportation hub, as it was the point of transfer between Montreal ferries and the land route to Saint-Jean-sur-Richelieu, gateway to Lake Champlain and the Hudson River. The construction of a rail line between La Prairie and Saint-Jean-sur-Richelieu would greatly accelerate the commercial development of the village. River transport equally played an important role in La Prairie's history.

Geography and climate 
Like the rest of southwestern Quebec, La Prairie has hot summers and cold winters, for a generally temperate climate. Winters are cold and sometimes long (snow is usually present from mid-November to mid-April), with temperatures occasionally dipping below -30 °C, not counting the windchill. During snowstorms, snowfall frequently surpasses 40 centimeters. In the summer, temperatures sometimes exceed 30 °C.

Demographics 

Transportation 

The CIT Le Richelain provides commuter and local bus services.

Environment 
In 2013, Grand Boisé conservation park is planned to be created and orchestrated by Nature-Action. The park would include Smithers' swamp, as well as, Hydro-Quebec's servitude area in which the western chorus frog, a vulnerable species in Quebec, is found in greatest numbers. There is a controversy involving the city housing development in that area which was supposed to be conserved integrally with high priority according to RCM of Roussillon 1990s' maps. Local environmental organisms, such as Vigile verte and Projet Rescousse, are denouncing the choice of that land for housing development. The debate is ongoing.

Education 
The town has three high schools: l'École de la Magdeleine, a public French school which offers the International Baccalaureate (IB) Programme, Collège Jean de la Mennais, a private mixed French school and Saint-François-Xavier, a public French school.

The South Shore Protestant Regional School Board previously served the municipality.

Gallery

See also 
Saint Lawrence River
Saint Jacques River (Roussillon)
Brossard—La Prairie
La Prairie (provincial electoral district)
List of cities in Quebec

References

External links 

 

 
Cities and towns in Quebec
Quebec populated places on the Saint Lawrence River
1647 establishments in the French colonial empire
Incorporated places in Roussillon Regional County Municipality